Football Club West Armenia, are an Armenian football club based in the capital Yerevan.

History
On 13 June 2019, FC West Armenia was officially founded in Yerevan by Vahe Stepanyan. In its first year of foundation, West Armenia took part in the Armenian First League. Mika Stadium was the home ground of West Armenia. On May 31st, 2021, the club announced that it will no longer participate in any competition due to financial difficulties. In July 2022, along with SC Mika, Gandzasar Kapan, FC Syunik and Lernayin Artsakh (who are represented by a reserve team due to being promoted to Armenian Premier League), West Armenia were given license to participate in 2022-23 Armenian First League season

League and cup

Current squad

 (on loan from FC Ararat-Armenia)
 (on loan from FC Ararat-Armenia)
 (on loan from FC Ararat-Armenia)

Managerial history
  Armen Shahgeldyan (13 June 2019 – 8 August 2020)
  Hayk Hovhannisyan (1 December 2020 – 31 May 2021)
   (2022-present)

References

Football clubs in Armenia
Football clubs in Yerevan
Association football clubs established in 2019
2019 establishments in Armenia